The 1995 Miami Redskins football team was an American football team that represented Miami University in the Mid-American Conference (MAC) during the 1995 NCAA Division I-A football season. In its sixth season under head coach Randy Walker, Miami compiled an 8–2–1 record (6–1–1 against MAC opponents), finished in a second place in the MAC, and outscored all opponents by a combined total of 326 to 165.

The team's statistical leaders included Sam Ricketts with 1,337 passing yards, Deland McCullough with 1,627 rushing yards, and Tremayne Banks with 733 receiving yards.

Schedule

References

Miami
Miami RedHawks football seasons
Miami Redskins football